was a Japanese economist.

Biography
Uzawa was born on July 21, 1928 in Yonago, Tottori to a farming family.

He attended the Tokyo First Middle School (currently the Hibiya High School ) and the First Higher School, Japan (now the University of Tokyo's College of Arts and Sciences faculty).
 
He graduated from the Mathematics Department of the University of Tokyo in 1951; he was a special research student from 1951 to 1953.

A paper on decentralized economic planning written by him caught the eye of Kenneth Arrow at the Stanford University, he went to study Economics at Stanford University in 1956 with Fulbright fellowship, and became a research assistant, then assistant professor  in 1956, then assistant professor at the University of California, Berkeley in 1960, and then associate professor at Stanford in 1961.  Meanwhile, in 1962, he received a Ph.D. from Tohoku University. He afterwards was professor at the University of Chicago in 1964, and later assumed the position of professor of the Department of Economics at the University of Tokyo in 1969. He also taught at Niigata University, Chuo University, and United Nations University. Joseph E. Stiglitz and George A. Akerlof did research under Uzawa at the University of Chicago and David Cass studied under Uzawa at Stanford University.

Uzawa was a senior fellow at the social, commonness, and capital research center of Doshisha University. He held the position of the president of the Econometric Society from 1976 to 1977. He also held the position of Counsel for the Development Bank of Japan's Research Institute of Capital Formation (RICF) from 1968 until his passing.

Contributions 
Uzawa initiated the field of mathematical economics in postwar days and formulated the growth theory of neoclassical economics. This is reflected in the Uzawa–Lucas model, the Uzawa iteration, the Uzawa condition, and Uzawa's Theorem, among others.

In his 1962 paper, Uzawa proved that the two of Walrasian equilibrium and Brouwer's fixed-point theorem are equivalent.

Recognition
1983 - Person of Cultural Merit
1989 - Member of Japan Academy
1995 - National Academy of Sciences Visiting Fellow
1997 - Order of Culture
2009 - Blue Planet Prize
Econometric Society Fellow (Lifetime)

Bibliography

Books

Chapters in books

Selected journal articles

Working Papers 
 Koopmans, Tjalling C.; Uzawa, Hirofumi (1982). "Constancy and Constant Differences of Price Elasticities of Demand," Cowles Foundation Discussion Papers 654, Cowles Foundation for Research in Economics, Yale University.

References

Further reading

External links 
 
 
 

1928 births
2014 deaths
People from Yonago, Tottori
Japanese economists
20th-century American economists
21st-century American economists
Growth economists
Stanford University Department of Economics faculty
University of California, Berkeley faculty
University of Chicago faculty
Academic staff of the University of Tokyo
Academic staff of Niigata University
Academic staff of Chuo University
Academic staff of Doshisha University
Academic staff of United Nations University
University of Tokyo alumni
Tohoku University alumni
Foreign associates of the National Academy of Sciences
Members of the Japan Academy
Presidents of the Econometric Society
Fellows of the Econometric Society
Presidents of the Japanese Economic Association
Persons of Cultural Merit
Recipients of the Order of Culture